Broom Development Engineering is a British motorcycle manufacturer, and provides research and development services to the automotive and aerospace industries. Established in 1982 by engineer, Hesketh test rider and motorcycle racer Mick Broom, the company  is based at Turweston Airfield near Brackley, Northamptonshire not far from the Silverstone racing circuit and has continued to improve the Hesketh V1000 engine and frame performance as well as updating earlier motorcycles to the latest specification. It produced each year about a dozen new V1000 EN10 motorcycles which were the V1000 with oil cooling improvements including an oil radiator to cool the  rear cylinder. It has also produced fifty Hesketh Vampire tourers to customer specifications. Mick Broom put the Hesketh business up for sale in September 2008. The Hesketh motorcycle side of Broom Development Engineering was taken over by Mr Paul Sleeman who relocated the business south of London and intends to continue the improvements to the present models, with back-up and spares to present Hesketh owners and in time introduce new models.

Model range

References

External links

Motorcycle manufacturers of the United Kingdom